The Christies Beach Football Club is an Australian rules football team based in the outer southern suburbs of Adelaide that first fielded junior teams in the Southern Football League in 1964.  In 1966 senior teams were formed and almost instant success was achieved with A-Grade premierships in 1967 and 1968.
The Christies Beach Football Club continues to field teams in both Senior and Junior grades in the Southern Football League.  Between 2016 and 2019, Christies Beach fielded Women's teams in the Adelaide Footy League (previously South Australian Women's Football League).

Christies Beach has produced a number of Australian Football League (AFL) players including Jason Horne-Francis (North Melbourne/Port Adelaide), Dean Brogan (Port Adelaide/GWS), Nigel Smart (Adelaide), Tony Modra (Adelaide/Fremantle), and  Chris Groom (Adelaide/Fremantle/North Melbourne).

A-Grade Premierships
1967 SFL A-Grade
1968 SFL A-Grade  
1971 SFL A-Grade Undefeated  
1972 SFL A-Grade
1974 SFL A-Grade
1983 SFL Division 1 
1994 SFL Division 1

Women's Premierships
2017 Adelaide Footy League Women Division 2

Greatest SFL Team 
To celebrate the 125th anniversary of the Southern Football League, each club was asked to name their "Greatest Team" whilst participating in the SFL.

References

External links

 

 
 

Southern Football League (SA) Clubs
Australian rules football clubs in South Australia
1963 establishments in Australia
Australian rules football clubs established in 1963
Adelaide Footy League clubs